WXEM (1460 kHz "La Mejor") is a commercial AM radio station licensed to Buford, Georgia, and serving the Atlanta metropolitan area. The station is owned by La Favorita, Inc., and airs a Regional Mexican music format.  It simulcasts with two other Atlanta-area stations owned by La Favorita, AM 1600 WAOS in Austell and AM 1130 WLBA in Gainesville.

WXEM is powered at 5,000 watts by day.  But at night, to avoid interfering with other stations on AM 1460, WXEM dramatically drops its power to 193 watts.  It uses a non-directional antenna at all times.  The transmitter is on Radio Park Drive, near Interstate 985 in Buford.  WXEM is considered a Class B station by the Federal Communications Commission.

The station began broadcasting on December 12, 1957.

References

External links

XEM
Radio stations established in 1969
1969 establishments in Georgia (U.S. state)